Omar Daoud (9 April 1983 – 9 May 2018) was a Libyan professional footballer who played as a defender. He was an international for the Libya national team, and was best known for playing for Libyan club Al Ahli Tripoli and Algerian club JS Kabylie.

Death 
He died on 9 May 2018 in a car accident near his home town Shahhat, Libya.

References

1983 births
2018 deaths
Libyan footballers
Libyan expatriate footballers
Libya international footballers
2006 Africa Cup of Nations players
JS Kabylie players
Expatriate footballers in Algeria
Libyan expatriate sportspeople in Algeria
Al-Ahli SC (Tripoli) players
Association football defenders
Road incident deaths in Libya
Libyan Premier League players